1,1-Dimethylethylenediamine is the organic compound with the formula (CH)N)CHCHNH.  It is a colorless liquid with a fishy odor.  It features one primary amine and a tertiary amine.  It is used to prepare a chelating diamine-containing ligands for the preparation of metal catalysts.  It is a precursor to the drug chloropyramine.

See also
 1,2-Dimethylethylenediamine
 Dimethylaminopropylamine

References

Diamines
Chelating agents